Monkey Trouble is a 1994 American comedy drama film directed by Franco Amurri and starring Thora Birch and Harvey Keitel. Amurri dedicated the film to his daughter Eva and named the film's protagonist after her.

Plot
In Los Angeles, nine-year-old Eva Gregory longs for a pet dog but can't get one because her mother Amy believes she isn't responsible enough and her stepfather Tom, a police lieutenant, is allergic to fur. This is further complicated when she cannot keep a pet at her biological father Peter's house, because of his job as a pilot and his frequent travels. Tom's daughter Tessa occasionally babysits Eva and her toddler brother Jack.

A gypsy kleptomaniac vagabond Azro, whose wife and son Mark recently left him, lives off the grid with his intelligent Capuchin monkey Fingers. Working as a hurdy gurdy-playing busker at Venice Beach, Azro uses Fingers to lure in tourists and pickpocket them. A pair of Italian American mafia members named Drake and Charlie proposition Azro with joining their crime syndicate, with Fingers using his pickpocket skills to burglarize the homes of wealthy residents. In a test run to see Fingers' skills, the three men drive to a random residence, which just happens to be Eva's home. Fingers successfully steals various expensive items and Azro is admitted to the crime group. Fingers, who suffers from poor treatment from Azro, later manages to run away and hides in a park near Eva's house.

The next day as Eva is walking home from school, Fingers drops from a tree and latches onto Eva. She instantly connects with him and names him "Dodger", as he likes Eva's Dodgers baseball hat. Eva hides the monkey in her bedroom, but when she has to attend school, she leaves him in the care of a pet store businesswoman named Annie. She becomes more responsible with her chores and helps take care of her brother Jack, to whom she reveals Dodger. Meanwhile, Tom finds himself sneezing frequently, and suspects he must have a cold or their apartment has a rat problem. Azro tries to find the monkey to the frustration of the mafia members.

On a weekend Eva is supposed to spend visiting Peter at his house, she learns Peter will actually be out of town. Eva keeps this from her parents so that she can have his place to herself and Dodger for the weekend. Though she doesn't have a key to the house, Dodger is able to break in. With no money for food, Eva decides to busk for earnings with Dodger at the Venice Beach Boardwalk. While Eva is riding her bike to the boardwalk, Dodger and Azro spot each other, and Dodger jumps off the bike, leading to a chase between him and Azro. Azro is taken away by the mafia members before he can capture the monkey. Dodger and Eva start their performance with the former secretly pickpocketing everybody just as he did when with Azro.

Eva starts noticing Dodger's pickpocketing when he steals items while hiding in her backpack at a grocery store. Realizing he was taught how to pickpocket and break into buildings, Eva trains him to quit stealing. Azro learns about the grocery store incident, and a store manager gives him Peter's address. Just as Eva is preparing to return home and call a taxi, Azro unexpectedly arrives at the house, frightening both Eva and Dodger. The duo escape the house and manage to disconnect Azro's mobile home from his pickup truck. The next day, Azro finds out Dodger is being kept at Annie's pet shop and he successfully steals Dodger back. Azro is aghast when he discovers that the monkey won't steal anymore during a meeting with the mafia members.

Meanwhile, Amy and Tom, who have been dealing with reports of stolen jewelry in the neighborhood, discover more stolen property in Eva's room. They confront her about it and she tries to explain how her hidden monkey must've been responsible, but they don't believe her. Things get worse when Peter stops by and reveals that he had been in Canada all weekend, which exposes Eva's lie about her visit. Heartbroken at the disappearance of Dodger and the fact that no one believes her, Eva runs away to look for Dodger after her friend Katie calls and tells her she saw Dodger at a park. Meanwhile, Jack ends up saying his first word, "monkey", revealing to Amy, Peter, and Tom that there really is a monkey in the house and that Eva was telling the truth. Dodger has again managed to escape from Azro and returned to Eva's room without her knowledge.

At the park, Eva is accosted by a furious Azro, who kidnaps her to locate the monkey. Eva's family, along with Tom's fellow police officers, search for Eva and discover that Dodger has saved her after stealing Tom's gun. Azro and the mafia mobsters are arrested in their attempt to escape. Mark tries taking Dodger back, but it's clear Dodger has become close to Eva. Eva proves to her mother that she is responsible and Tom reveals that he has overcome his fur allergy, having built up a resistance to it. As Dodger becomes the family pet, Eva brings him and Jack to school for a show and tell activity.

Cast

Soundtrack 
The film contains the following songs.

 "Sold for Me" – The Aintree Boys
 "Posie" – The Aintree Boys
 "Who Gets the Loot" – Quo
 "VB Rap" – Gee Boyz
 "Girls" – Gee Boyz
 "Monkey Shines" – Robert J. Walsh

Reception

Box office 
The film debuted at number 3 in the North American box office, dropping to seventh place the following week.

Critical reception 
On Rotten Tomatoes, Monkey Trouble has a rating of 55% based on 11 critics' reviews. 

Roger Ebert awarded the film three stars, and though he said it has a formulaic plot, he called it a "splendid family film." He added, "It's no mistake that the credits for 'Monkey Trouble' give top billing to the monkey, named Finster. He steals the show with a fetching performance that goes beyond 'training,' and into acting itself. And the show is a quirky, bright, PG-rated adventure that's as entertaining as 'Free Willy.'" Ebert did criticize the film's decision to identify the villain character as a gypsy, reasoning Azro "could have had a non-specific background and the movie would have worked just as well, without giving its young audiences a lesson in prejudice."

David Hunter of The Hollywood Reporter positively cited Thora Birch's performance and wrote "Rising to the occasion in just about every scene, she wonderfully executes the humor, wonder, excitement and brief troubles her character experiences in Franco Amurri and Stu Krieger's well-groomed screenplay."

Positive reviews also cited the film for showing Harvey Keitel's "broad comic side." Joanna Berry of the Radio Times wrote, "Quite what the hard-as-nails star of Reservoir Dogs and Bad Lieutenant is doing in this comedy adventure is anyone's guess, but his tongue-in-cheek performance will delight adults almost as much as the monkey business will enchant young children."

Year-end lists 
 Dishonorable mention – John Hurley, Staten Island Advance

Home media 
New Line released Monkey Trouble on DVD on September 3, 2002.

References

External links
 
 
 
 

1990s children's comedy films
1994 films
American children's comedy films
English-language Italian films
Films about monkeys
Films directed by Franco Amurri
Films scored by Mark Mancina
Films set in Los Angeles
Films shot in California
Films shot in Los Angeles
Italian comedy films
Italian independent films
Japanese comedy films
Japanese independent films
New Line Cinema films
1990s English-language films
1990s American films
1990s Japanese films